László Szlávics (born August 11, 1959) is a Hungarian sculptor and medallic artist. He publishes his works under the names László, ifj. Szlávics or Laszlo Szlavics Jr.

Biography 
Between 1973 and 1977 he attended the Arts & Crafts Secondary School in Budapest. After obtaining his Secondary School Leaving Certificate his training was supervised by his father also László Szlávics a goldsmith and sculptor and the sculptor Agamemnon Makris. Since 1973 he has lived and worked in the Százados artist’ colony in Budapest. Since 1995 he has often designed memorial coins for the National Bank of Hungary.

Works 
Szlávics is primarily a medalist. His works include every kind of medal, from those displaying the craftsmanship of the traditional minter to such as tend towards small sculptures. The dual commitment tend towards can be appreciated in all his works.

From the middle of the 1970s his sculptures, reliefs and medals have been characterized by realism and the precision of their craftsmanship. In the 1980s he was noted for handmade medals engraved in a steel negative, a technique reminiscent of ancient coinage. (Birds, Africa, Count István Széchenyi, Hungarian generals executed at Arad in 1849 stb.). Cast bronze works show the influence of Cubism. Among them, the most notable of the first half of the 1990s are a series of 20 medals inspired by Vincent van Gogh works.

In the second half of the 1990s, he made use of natural materials (bone, feathers, seashells &c.,). These are original in style, and are on the fringe of the medal-genre (Cultic proto-money). As a counterpoint to this, he produced several series of medals using an industrial, where time – is measured by movements within the object – visible mode. (mechanical medals). The medals are activated by the active contribution of the public.

Since the start of the 21st century, he has tried to renew the medal arts, by searching for the limits. In 2006, Hungarian Medalists awarded him – the first – Ligeti Erika Prize. In 2007, he was awarded the Béni Ferenczy Prize, grand prix of the 16th National Biennial of Medal Art. Also in that year, he was among the two selected artists at the Art Medal World Congress FIDEM XXX (Colorado Springs, USA). In his small sculptures, he often used objets trouvés given new functions. (In memoriam Man Ray,  An hour with Salvador Dalí , Hotline). This Interactive mobile sculptures are activated by the public.

Since 2008, he has produced many wooden small sculptures. Many of them are small sculptures, in the traditional sense, which, in a way, remind of houses and ruins. Large clock sculptures are related to the aforementioned both formally and technically. They are clearly contemporary works, of art, incorporating conventional devices such as the pendulum or spring mechanism, carrying out the functions of a clock. Every hour, and half hour the mark the time by striking the soundbar.

Exhibitions (selection)

Group shows 

Since 1975 his works have been exhibited in 15 countries. The most important are:
 1981, 1983, 1985, 1987, 2005 National Biennial of Small Plastic, Pécs, Hungary
 Since 1983 every National Biennial of Medal Art, Sopron, Hungary
 1988, 1992, 1996, 1998, 2000, 2002, 2005, 2008, 2010 National Wood Sculpture Exhibition, Nagyatád, Hungary
 1991 – "brug tussen oost en west", Oudenbosch (Netherlands)
 1994 – Small Sculpture '94, Gallery Vigadó, Budapest, Hungary
 Since 1994 every F.I.D.E.M. Medal Exhibitions (Budapest, Neuchâtel, The Hague, Weimar, Paris, Seixal, Colorado Springs, Tampere)
 1995 – Email International 3, Coburg (Germany)
 1995 – Helyzetkép/Hungarian sculpture, Kunsthalle Budapest, Hungary
 1995 –  Workshopcorner  – Measuring Time, Museum of Applied Arts, Budapest, Hungary
 1996 – 9th Cloisonne Jewelry Contest, Tokyo (Japan)
 1996 – Workshopcorner – Jewels, Museum of Applied Arts, Budapest, Hungary
 1996 – A Step into the Future, Applied Arts Exhibition, Kunsthalle, Budapest, Hungary
 1997 – Magyar Szalon '97, Kunsthalle, Budapest, (Hungary)
 1997 – VIIth International Biennale of Small Graphic Form and Ex-libris, Ostrów Wielkopolski (Polish)
 2001 – Sculpture from here and beyond, Kunsthalle, Budapest, (Hungary)
 2002 – Masaccio 600 International Art Medal Competition, Ein Vered, (Israel)
 2004 – Dante Europeo XIV. Biennale Internazionale Dantesca, Ravenna (Italia)
 2005, 2008, 2010 – International Biennial of Contemporary Medals of Seixal (Portuguese)
 2005 – H. C. Andersen 200 International Art Medal Competition, Hadassa Neurim, (Israel)
 2006 – The Way 1956–2006, National Fine Art Exhibition, Kunsthalle, Budapest, (Hungary)
 2008 – Znad Dunaju Wełtawy i Wisły. Medalierzy i ich dzieła Wroclaw Museum of Medals, Wrocław (Polish).
 2008 – 2009 Craft & Design, Museum of Applied Arts, Budapest, Hungary
 2009 – Dedukció – 1st Biennale of Sculptures, Művészetmalom, Szentendre, Hungary

One man shows 
Since 1977 he has had 50 one man shows in Hungary and other countries. The most important are:

 1977 – Képzőművészeti Kivitelező Vállalat Klubja, Budapest, Hungary
 1989 – BM Duna Palota, Budapest, Hungary
 1991 – Galerie Simon, Altenahr, Germany
 1995 – Gallery Géza Gárdonyi, Dunakeszi, Hungary
 2002 – Collegium Hungaricum, Wien, Austria
 2006 – Gallery Árkád (Association of Hungarian Fine and Applied Artists, Gallery, Budapest, Hungary)
 2009 – "Fifty", Gallery Keve, Ráckeve, Hungary
 2009 – Gallery Körmendi, Sopron, Hungary
 2009 – Lábasház, Sopron, Hungary
 2012 – "Síkplasztikáim", Symbol Art Gallery, 21 – 28 February 2012. Budapest, Hungary
 2015 – "Za hranicami medailérstva...", NBS Múzeum Mincí a Medalí, Kremnica, Slovakia.

Awards & Recognitions (selection) 
The most important national or international awards:
 1993 – Faces and Fates National Portrait Biennale, Budapest, Hungary, Golden Diploma, (Main Prize)
 1996 – 9th Cloisonne Jewelry Contest Tokyo, Japan, Encouragement Prize
 1996 – Head or Tails, Art medal exhibition, Budapest, Hungary, Grand Prix
 1997 – 11th National Biennial of Medal Art, Sopron, Hungary, Civitas Fidelissima-prize (Prize of the Municipal City Government of Sopron, Silver Medals)
 2000 – 7th National Wood Sculpture Exhibition, Nagyatád, Hungary, Prize of Nagyatád city.
 2002 – Masaccio 600 International Art Medal Competition, Ein Vered, Israel, Special Mention
 2003 – 14th 11th National Biennial of Medal Art, Sopron, Hungary, Civitas Fidelissima Prize (Prize of the Municipal City Government of Sopron, Silver Medals)
 2003 – Jenő Rejtő Memorial Exhibition, Budapest, The Museum of Literature Petőfi, First prize
 2006 – II. Articum International Biennial, Szolnok, Hungary, Sculpture Prize
 2006 – Erika Ligeti prize
 2007 – 16th National Biennial of Medal Art, 16th Hungarian Biennale of Medal Art, Sopron, Hungary, Béni Ferenczy Prize, The Grand Prize awarded by the Municipal Government of Győr-Moson-Sopron County
 2007 – Art Medal World Congress FIDEM XXX, Colorado Springs, USA, "Honorable Mention"
 2015 – 20th National Biennial of Medal Art, 20th Hungarian Biennale of Medal Art, Sopron, Hungary, Béni Ferenczy Prize, The Grand Prize awarded by the Municipal City Government of Sopron

Collections which include work by László Szlávics Jr. (selection) 
 Lajos Kassák Memorial Museum, Budapest, Hungary
 Military History Museum, Budapest, Hungary
 Museum of Applied Arts, Budapest, Hungary
 Hungarian National Gallery, Budapest, Hungary
 National Firebrigade Museum, Budapest, Hungary
 Museum of Győr-Moson-Sopron County is Sopron, Sopron, Hungary
 József Katona Museum, Kecskemét, Hungary
 Ottó Herman Museum, Miskolc, Hungary
 Hungarian National Museum, Budapest, Hungary
 Van Gogh Dokumentátiecentrum, Nuenen, Netherlands
 Rijksmuseum Het Koninklijk Penningkabinet, Leiden, Netherland
 "Basis" School of Sculpture Art Medal collection Ein Vered, Israel
 Centro Dantesco, Ravenna, Italia
 British Museum, London, United Kingdom
 University Museum of Bergen, Norway
 Muzeum Sztuki Medalierskiej, Wrocław, Poland
 NBS – Múzeum mincí a medailí Kremnica, Slovakia
 Collection of Drs. Miklós Müller and Jan S. Keithly - New York, United States

Buildings which display his work 
 1979 – Comedy Theatre of Budapest, Budapest, Hungary
 1988 – János Damjanich bust, Szeged, Hungary
 1989 – Miklós Zrínyi bust, Székesfehérvár, Hungary
 1990 – Artúr Görgey bust, Ministry of National Defence, Budapest, Hungary
 1992 – Saint Florian relief, Budapest, Hungary
 2006 – János Tornyai bust, Hódmezővásárhely, Hungary
 2006 – Frigyes Karinthy (writer) portrait, Karinthy Teatre, Budapest, Hungary
 2007 – Count István Széchenyi bust, Seafaring Secondary School, Budapest, Hungary
 2009 – Ferenc Liszt bust, Sopron Music School, Sopron, Hungary
 2010 – John Lennon bust, Sopron Music School, Sopron, Hungary 
 2012 – Ferenc Liszt bust, Universiti of West Hungary Savaria Campus, Szombathely, Hungary
 2012 – István Örkény portrait, Zsigmond Móricz City Library, Tata, Hungary
 2013 – Janis Joplin bust, Ferenc Erkel Grade School, Budapest, Hungary

Medals ad small sculptures (selection) 
 1992 – Ferenc Flór Prize, memorial plaque and badge, Ministry of National Defence,
 1992 – János Hunyadi Prize, memorial plaque and badge, Ministry of National Defence, Hungary
 1992 – Miklós Zrínyi Prize, memorial plaque and badge, Ministry of National Defence, Hungary
 1996 – Nemzeti Minőségi Díj, small sculpture, Hungary's prime minister
 1998 – For the Children of the World, UNICEF 2000–forint, silver memorial coin, Hungarian National Bank
 1999 – István Menyhárd Prize, small sculpture, Hungarian Chamber of Engineers
 2000 – Gejza Ferdinandy Prize, memorial plaque and badge, Ministry of National Defence, Hungary
 2000 – Szilárd Zielinski Prize, small sculpture, Hungarian Chamber of Engineers
 2001 – Figures is Hungarian books for young people, 200–forint, memorial coin, Hungarian National Bank
 Ferenc Molnár: A Pál utcai fiúk
 Mihály Fazekas: Lúdas Matyi
 Sándor Petőfi: János Vitéz
 János Arany: Toldi
 2001 – Imre Pekár Prize, small sculpture, Chamber of Engineers, Hajdú–Bihar County.
 2001 – László Csány Prize, small sculpture, Hungarian Chamber of Engineers
 2002 – Pál Hajnik Prize, memorial plaque and badge, Ministry of National Defence, Hungary
 2003 – András Hadik Prize, memorial plaque and badge, Ministry of National Defence, Hungary
 2004 – Pécsi ókeresztény sírkamrák, 5000-forint, silver, memorial coin, Hungarian National Bank
 2005 – Lázár Mészáros Prize, memorial plaque and badge, Ministry of National Defence, Hungary
 2006 – Gyula Andrássy Prize, memorial plaque and badge, Ministry of National Defence, Hungary
 2007 – 550 anniversary of accession of King Mathias Corvinus , 50.000.–forint, gold, memorial coin, Hungarian National Bank
 2007 – Bishop Lajos Ordass Prize, small sculpture and memorial plaque, Hungarian Lutheran Church
 2007 – Sándor Prónay Prize, small sculpture and memorial plaque, Hungarian Lutheran Church
 2008 – John Calvin memorial medals, Hungarian Calvinist Church
 2009 – 200th Anniversary of birth of Ferenc Erkel, 5000-forint, memorial coin, Hungarian National Bank. Collector-series "The smallest gold coin of the world".
 2010 – 200th Anniversary of birth of Adam Clark, 5000-forint, memorial coin, Hungarian National Bank. Collector-series "The smallest gold coin of the world".

Memberships 
1984 – Association of Hungarian Creative Artists
1991 – Association of Hungarian Fine and Applied Artists, Medal Section.
1995 – FIDEM, Fédération Internationale de la Médaille d'Art.
1996 – 1998 British Art Medal Society (BAMS).
1997 – Százados úti Művésztelep Egyesület.
2007 – Association of Hungarian Fine and Applied Artists, Goldsmith Section.
2008 – Association of Hungarian Fine and Applied Artists, Sculpture Section.

Offices Held 
 1989 – 1992 Aurea Arts & Crafts Association Member of the Executive.
 1992 – 1999 Aurea Art Support Trust Member of the Executive.
 1995 – ART '95 Limited Partnership Founding President.
 2000 – Association of Hungarian Fine and Applied Artists Medal Section member of the Executive.
 2004 – Association of Hungarian Fine and Applied Artists Medal Section President.
 2004 – Association of Hungarian Fine and Applied Artists member of the Presidium.
 2005 – National Biennial of Medal Art member of the Organizing Committee.
 2015 – 2019 Association of Hungarian Fine and Applied Artists Sculpture Section President.

Gallery

Additional informations

References

Further reading 
 Imre Soós: Van Gogh medals of László, Szlávics Jr. (Művészet és Barátai, Budapest, 1996 September–October)
 Viktória L. Kovásznai: László, Szlávics Jr.  (Budapest, 1997. Publisher: Art ’95)
 Viktória L. Kovásznai: A Cycle of Cultic Proto-Money by László, Szlávics jr. 1996–1997   (Budapest, 1999–2000. Publisher: Art ’95)
 Viktória L. Kovásznai: A series of ritual proto-money by László Szlávics Jr.  (London, The Medal, No. 36 Spring 2000.)
 Arnold Nieuwendam: Peningen van ifj. Szlávics László – Een medailleur uit Hongarije  (MUNTkoerier 11/2003)
 Judit Baranyi:  László Szlávics Jr., Kortárs Magyar Művészeti Lexikon III. kötet (Budapest, 2001. Publisher: Enciklopédia kiadó)
 Viktória L. Kovásznai: Time and Space in Recent Works by László Szlávics jr. 1995–2005 (Budapest, 2006. Publisher: Art ’95)
 Viktória L. Kovásznai:  Time and space in recent works by László Szlávics Jr.  (London, The Medal, No. 50 Spring 2007.)
 Viktória L. Kovásznai: A kitapintható idő és tér – ifj. Szlávics László újabb éremmunkáiról (Budapest, Magyar Iparművészet 2008/2)
 Antal Tóth: A Wizard in Hungarian Medallic Art – Exhibition of László Szlávics jr., winner of the Grand Prize of the 16th National Biennial of Medal Art  (16th National Biennial of Medal Art, catalog, Sopron, 2009)
 BTÉ: Történetek formákkal, anyagokkal – ifj. Szlávics László kiállítása a Körmendi Galériában (Sopron Megyei Jogú Város hivatalos honlapja 2009. június 20.)
 Bakács László: Liszt Ferenc mellszobrát kapta a soproni zeneiskola (Nyugat-Hírmondó kulturális és hírújság elektronikus változata, 2009. június 21.)
 Megnyílt ifj. Szlávics László kiállítása a Körmendi Galériában (Soproni Krónika – Sopron TV. 2009. június 22.)
 Láng Judit: John Lennon – Sopronban, Presztízs magazine, October 2010, online version, 25. 11. 2010.
 Viktória L. Kovásznai: László Szlávics Jr., monography , (Budapest, 2012. Publisher: Argumentum)
 Arnold Nieuwendam: Nieuw boek over Szlávics László , (MUNTkoerier 1/2014)
 László Beke: Medal artist László Szlávics jr.: a lesson in contemporary (art) history for viewers – Exhibition of László Szlávics jr., winner of the Grand Prize of the 20th National Biennial of Medal Art  (21st National Biennial of Medal Art, catalog, Sopron, 2017)
 Viktória L. Kovásznai: Time and space differently - Recent medallic work by László Szlávics Jr,  (The Medal No. 73, 2018 London)

External links 

 Common site of the junior László Szlávics
 Art '95 site
 Hungarian members of the FIDEM

1959 births
Living people
Artists from Budapest
20th-century sculptors
21st-century sculptors
Hungarian sculptors
Hungarian medallists
Coin designers